Dipton can refer to:

Dipton, County Durham, England
Dipton, New Zealand